Arthur Bent Balinger (February 1, 1915 – June 10, 2011) was an American actor known for television roles throughout the 1950s, 1960s and 1970s. Specifically, Balinger was cast in numerous productions created by Jack Webb and his production company, Mark VII Limited.

Balinger was born to parents Sheldon and Ellen Bent Balinger in Los Angeles, California. He was raised in the Los Angeles metropolitan area. Balinger began his career as a radio announcer, before transitioning to television as an actor. His credits included Dragnet and Emergency! (as "Battalion Chief Conrad"). He largely retired from television after the 1970s. One of his last memorable parts in film was that of the dedication ceremony announcer in the blockbuster hit The Towering Inferno.
Balinger also worked for the McDonnel Douglas Aircraft company in the 1970s performing several on-camera appearances as well as voice-only narration of multiple McDonnel Douglas promotional films (See Periscope Films available on YouTube.)

Balinger died at the Terwilliger Plaza Nursing Home in Portland, Oregon, at the age of 96.

Filmography

References

External links
 
 

1915 births
2011 deaths
People from Los Angeles
Male actors from Los Angeles
American male film actors
American male television actors
20th-century American male actors
American radio personalities
Death in Oregon